"Word Association", also called "Racist Word Association Interview," "Racist Word Association" and "Dead Honky", is a Saturday Night Live sketch first aired on December 13, 1975, featuring Richard Pryor and Chevy Chase.

Synopsis

At a job interview, the interviewer (Chase) asks the applicant, Mr. Wilson (Pryor) to take a word association test. Partway through the test, the interviewer begins using increasingly offensive anti-black racial slurs, to which Wilson reacts with anti-white slurs (including "honky"). Finally, the interviewer says "nigger", to which Wilson replies "Dead honky" and glares at the interviewer, his face twitching. The interviewer, frightened, offers him the job, as well as paid vacation and the highest janitor's salary in the country.

Origin

Authorship of the sketch is disputed, with claims being made both by Chase and by Paul Mooney.

According to Mooney, when Pryor agreed to perform on Saturday Night Live, one of his conditions was that Mooney be hired as a scriptwriter. Mooney's interactions with Lorne Michaels and NBC executives were not positive, and he wrote the sketch as a direct response. He also noted that Pryor "despise(d)" Chase.

Chase, conversely, has described it as the result of a peaceful collaboration with Pryor, in which the paucity of anti-white slurs, relative to anti-black slurs, was "reflective of the lack of bigotry in [Pryor]."

Reception

In 2014, Rolling Stone ranked the sketch No. 10 in their list of the 50 "greatest Saturday Night Live sketches of all time", while in 2011, Paste ranked it No. 5 in their list of the 10 "most shocking moments" — an opinion shared by VH1. Don Cheadle declared it one of his favorite sketches, as did Keegan-Michael Key and Albert Brooks.

Today described it as "[o]ne of (Pryor's) most famous sketches" and a "signature moment() in SNL history", while Vulture observed that its "climax still feels dangerous and revelatory".
 
Pryor biographer Scott Saul stated that the use of the phrase dead honky' "transforms the word association test from a language game into a contest of wills, in which righteous courage is bound to prevail." Cultural historian Nick Marx described this as a transition from "a war of words (into) the threat of bodily harm", which he compared to "an articulation of a range of strategies for black oppositionality — from resentful protest to violent revolt".

The sketch has been cited in academic works on racism.

External links

References

Saturday Night Live sketches
Saturday Night Live in the 1970s
Richard Pryor
Ethnic and religious slurs